Graeme Ellis (born 1 February 1943) is  a former Australian rules footballer who played with Richmond in the Victorian Football League (VFL).		
	

Graeme's father, Percy Ellis, played 59 games with Fitzroy.

Notes

External links 
		

Living people
1943 births
Australian rules footballers from Victoria (Australia)
Richmond Football Club players